"My Chico" is a song by Italian singer Sabrina. It was written by Sabrina, O.Johnson, Elvio Moratto and produced by Elvio Moratto. The song was released in October 1988 as the album's second single. This song reached #1 in Italy. The music video for this song was filmed in Florence.

Song information
"My Chico" was Sabrina's second single in 1988, and was successful in a number of European countries. The song reached No. 1 in the Italian singles chart, and made the top 10 in Finland, Spain, Switzerland and the Netherlands. Sabrina co-wrote the song with Elvio Moratto, who would become her collaborator and producer for several more songs, including "Gringo" and some tracks on 1991's "Over the Pop" album.

Formats and track listings
 7" single 
 "My Chico" - 3:40
 "My Chico" (dub house mix) - 4:30

 12" single 
 "My Chico" (extended mix) - 5:25
 "My Chico" (dub house mix version) - 5:15
 "My Chico" - 3:39

 CD maxi 
 "My Chico" (extended version) - 5:25
 "My Chico" (dub house mix) - 5:15
 "My Chico" (radio version) - 3:40

 CD maxi 
 "My Chico" (radio version) - 3:43
 "My Chico" (dub house mix) - 5:14
 "All of Me" - 6:37
 "All of Me" (instrumental version) - 4:23

Credits
 Written by Moratto E., Johnson O. and Sabrina S.
 Artwork by Claude Caudron (12") and MJS (CD maxi)
 Photography by Roberto Rocchi
 Produced by Menzione

Charts

References

1988 songs
Number-one singles in Italy
Sabrina Salerno songs
1988 singles